Haifa is an Israeli port city.

Haifa may also refer to:

Places
Haifa District, an administrative district surrounding the city of Haifa
Haifa metropolitan area
Haifa Bay, a bay near Haifa
Haifa Street, in Baghdad, Iraq

 Haifa Airport (known as RAF Haifa, a Royal Air Force station, between 1942 and 1948)
 Port of Haifa, the largest Israel's international seaport

People
Haifaa al-Mansour, Saudi film director
Haifa bint Faisal Al Saud, Saudi royal
Haifa bint Muhammad Al Saud, Saudi royal
Haifa Wehbe, Lebanese singer
Haifa Zangana, Iraqi novelist
Hayfa Baytar, Syrian novelist

Other
Haifa (film), a 1996 film
HAIFA construction, a design for cryptographic hash functions

See also